The 2013–14 Slovenian First League was the 23rd season of the 1. A liga, Slovenia's premier handball league.

Team information 

The following twelve clubs competed in the 1. A liga during the 2013–14 season:

Personnel and kits
Following is the list of 2013–14 clubs, with their manager, captain, kit manufacturer and shirt sponsor.

Regular season

Standings

Pld - Played; W - Won; L - Lost; PF - Points for; PA - Points against; Diff - Difference; Pts - Points.

Championship play-offs

Final standings

Pld - Played; W - Won; L - Lost; PF - Points for; PA - Points against; Diff - Difference; Pts - Points.

Team roster
1 Urban Lesjak, 3 Blaž Blagotinšek, 5 Žiga Mlakar, 6 Gašper Marguč, 7 Rok Žuran, 8 Blaž Janc, 9 David Razgor, 11 Nikola Ranevski, 14 Sebastian Skube, 15 Vid Poteko, 16 Matevž Skok, 18 David Miklavčič, 19 Ivan Slišković, 21 Gregor Potočnik, 23 Stefan Čavor, 24 Nemanja Zelenović, 26 Igor Žabič, 33 Uroš Bundalo, 51 Borut Mačkovšek, 66 Máté Lékai and 77 Luka Žvižej

Head coach: Branko Tamše

Results
In the table below the home teams are listed on the left and the away teams along the top.

Relegation round

Final standings

Pld - Played; W - Won; L - Lost; PF - Points for; PA - Points against; Diff - Difference; Pts - Points.

Results
In the table below the home teams are listed on the left and the away teams along the top.

References

External links
 Slovenian Handball Federaration  

2013–14 domestic handball leagues
Slovenian First League
Slovenian First League
Handball competitions in Slovenia